Pseudotetracha is a genus of tiger beetles in the family Cicindelidae, formerly included within the genus Megacephala, and endemic to Australia.

Species

 Pseudotetracha australasiae (Hope, 1842)
 Pseudotetracha australis (Chaudoir, 1865)
 Pseudotetracha basalis (Macleay, 1866)
 Pseudotetracha blackburni (Fleutiaux, 1895)
 Pseudotetracha bostockii (Laporte, 1867)
 Pseudotetracha canninga (McCairns, Freitag, Rose & McDonald, 1997)
 Pseudotetracha castelnaui (Sloane, 1906)
 Pseudotetracha corpulenta (Horn, 1907)
 Pseudotetracha crucigera (Macleay, 1863)
 Pseudotetracha cuprascens (Sumlin, 1997)
 Pseudotetracha cylindrica (Macleay, 1863)
 Pseudotetracha greyana (Sloane, 1901)
 Pseudotetracha helmsi (Blackburn, 1892)
 Pseudotetracha hopei (Laporte, 1867)
 Pseudotetracha howittii (Laporte, 1867)
 Pseudotetracha intermedia (Sloane, 1906)
 Pseudotetracha ion (Sumlin, 1997)
 Pseudotetracha karratha (Sumlin, 1992)
 Pseudotetracha kimberleyensis (Mjoberg, 1916)
 Pseudotetracha marginicollis (Sloane, 1906)
 Pseudotetracha mendacia (Sumlin, 1997)
 Pseudotetracha murchisona (Fleutiaux, 1896)
 Pseudotetracha oleadorsa (Sumlin, 1992)
 Pseudotetracha pulchra (Brown, 1869
 Pseudotetracha scapularis (Macleay, 1863)
 Pseudotetracha serrella (Sumlin, 1997)
 Pseudotetracha spenceri (Sloane, 1897)
 Pseudotetracha timberensis Häckel & Anichtchenko, 2015
 Pseudotetracha whelani (Sumlin, 1992)

References

Cicindelidae